The Old Man of Restelo, also known as The Old Man of Belem, is a fictional character introduced by the Portuguese epic poet Luís de Camões in Canto IV of his work Os Lusíadas ("The Lusiads"). The Old Man of Restelo is variously interpreted as a symbol of pessimism, or as representing those who did not believe in the likely success of the then upcoming Portuguese voyages of discovery. The character appears at the embarkation of the first expedition to India (1497), giving warnings about the odyssey that was about to happen.

The Old Man's speech
This episode begins at the outset of the voyage of Vasco da Gama across unknown oceans. An old man (the Old Man of Restelo) goes down to confront the occupants of the ships, and argues that the reckless navigators, driven by greed for fame, glory and riches, are courting disaster for themselves and the Portuguese people.

This is the argument of the Old Man of Restelo against the voyage that Vasco da Gama and his crew were about to undertake:

 Os Lusíadas, Canto IV, 94-97: Burton's translation (1880)

 Os Lusíadas, Canto IV, 94-97

The position of Camoes
It remains uncertain to what degree Camões was in sympathy with the old man's view. There seems to be a contradiction between the writing of a large epic on maritime expeditions, in which there was a clear enthusiasm for the undertaking, and, on the other hand, the fear and pessimism that emerges in this speech and certain other passages in the work.

Modern references
Subsequent allusions in Portuguese to the Old Man of Restelo have tended to portray him in a negative lightas a "doubting Thomas", not as a "Cassandra" who expresses apposite cautions. For example, in a speech in 2013, the Brazilian President Dilma Rousseff said that Brazil would not have been discovered (by Europeans) if "the Old Man of Restelo had prevailed at that time, on that beach, there on the Tagus in Lisbon."

References 

Male characters in literature
Fictional Portuguese people
Portuguese culture
Works about philosophical pessimism